The Royal Canadian Henley Rowing Course is a rowing facility that is located in Port Dalhousie, St. Catharines, Ontario, Canada. The facility was constructed in 1903 as a permanent venue for the Royal Canadian Henley Regatta. The facility is located on the Martindale Pond.

In 1966, the facility was renovated. It was also renovated extensively in 1999 to stage the 1999 World Rowing Championships. The venue also hosted the 1970 World Rowing Championships and the rowing competitions at the 2015 Pan American Games. To stage the Games, the venue was again renovated in 2014.

The venue is classified by World Rowing as an "A" class venue.

An $820,000 upgrade was undertaken for the 2015 Pan American Games.

Lake specifications

The lake's dimensions follow the FISA rules for a rowing lake suitable for hosting a World Rowing Championship, World Rowing Cup, Pan American Games or Olympic regatta:
 Stillwater, with consistent water conditions
  straight length for racing
 Minimum water depth of 
 A return channel allowing boats to move to the start, separated from the main lake by an island

See also
Venues of the 2015 Pan American and Parapan American Games

References

Rowing in Canada
Venues of the 2015 Pan American Games
Rowing venues
Sports venues in St. Catharines
1903 establishments in Ontario